Bullerengue is a traditional musical genre and dance from the Caribbean Region of Colombia and the Darién Province in Panama. It is sung and preserved primarily by elderly women, accompanied by local artisan drums, and developed in the Palenques or Maroon communities.

Some renowned bullerengue singers are Petrona Martinez, Irene Martinez, Emilia Herrera, Estefanía Caycedo, Etelvina Maldonado, and Ceferina Banquez. In recent decades, Petrona Martínez and Totó la Momposina have increased Bullerengue's international popularity and success, the former having been granted the Latin Grammy Award for Best Folk Album.

References

 

Colombian styles of music
Cumbia music genres